The following is a list of choral symphonies.

Symphonies for chorus and orchestra 
Works are listed in chronological order. Works with an asterisk (*) indicate that text is used throughout the entire composition.

 Fantasy in C minor for Piano, Soloists and Orchestra, Op. 80, by Ludwig van Beethoven (1808) (not a symphony, but one of only two major concerted works to involve a chorus - see also Busoni (below))
 Symphony No. 9, Op. 125, by Ludwig van Beethoven (1824), the "Choral Symphony"
 Roméo et Juliette, Op. 17, by Hector Berlioz (1839)
 Grande symphonie funèbre et triomphale, Op. 15, by Hector Berlioz (1840)
 Lobgesang (also called Symphony No. 2 in B-flat major), Op. 52, by Felix Mendelssohn (1840)
 Faust Symphony, by Franz Liszt (1854)
 Dante Symphony, by Franz Liszt (1856)
 Kullervo, Op. 7, by Jean Sibelius (1892); text from the Kalevala
 Symphony No. 2 in C minor, Resurrection, by Gustav Mahler (1894)
 Symphony No. 3 in D minor, by Gustav Mahler (1896)
 Symphony No. 7, Op. 40, Korsymfoni, by Asger Hamerik (1897, rev. 1901-1906)
 Symphony No. 1 in E major, Op. 26, by Alexander Scriabin (1900)
 Piano Concerto, in C major, Op. 39, by Ferruccio Busoni (1904) (not a symphony, but one of only two major concerted works to involve a chorus - see also Beethoven (above))
 Symphony No. 3, by Guy Ropartz (1905)
 Symphony No. 8 in E-flat major, by Gustav Mahler (1907) *
 A Sea Symphony (Symphony No. 1), by Ralph Vaughan Williams (1909) *
 Der 100. Psalm, by Max Reger (1910) *
 Natursymphonie, by Siegmund von Hausegger (1911)
 Symphony No. 4 in E flat minor, Op. 55, by Joseph Ryelandt (1912)
 The Bells, Op. 35, by Sergei Rachmaninoff (1913) *
 Symphony No. 4, by Charles Ives (1916)
 Symphony No. 3, Op. 27, Song of the Night, by Karol Szymanowski (1916)
 Symphony No. 6, Op. 48, by Charles Tournemire (1917–18)
 A Symphony: New England Holidays, by Charles Ives (1919)
 Symphony No. 1 "The Gothic", by Havergal Brian (1919-1927)
 Symphony No. 3 in C major, Op. 21, by George Enescu (1921)
 Symphony No. 1, KSS30, by Kaikhosru Shapurji Sorabji (1921–22)
 Symphony No. 6, The Revolutionary, by Nikolai Myaskovsky (1921-1923)
 First Choral Symphony, by Gustav Holst (1924)
 Symphony No. 5, Der Schnitter Tod, by Julius Röntgen (1926)
 Symphony No. 8, Minder ved Amalienborg, BVN. 193, by Rued Langgaard (1926-28, rev. 1929-1934)
 Symphony No. 2 in B major, Op. 14, To October, by Dmitri Shostakovich (1927)
 Symphony No. 6, Rijck God, wie sal ic claghen, by Julius Röntgen (1928) *
 Symphony No. 2, O Holy Lord, by Jan Maklakiewicz (1928)
 Symphony No. 3 in E-flat major, Op. 20, The First of May, by Dmitri Shostakovich (1929)
 Morning Heroes, by Arthur Bliss (1930) *
 Symphony of Psalms, by Igor Stravinsky (1930) *
 Symphony No. 4, Das Siegeslied, by Havergal Brian (1933) *
 Symphony No. 4, Poem for the Komsomol Fighters, by Lev Knipper (1933/1965)
 Symphony No. 3, The Muses, by Cyril Scott (1937)
 Symphony No. 15, Sørstormen, BVN. 375, by Rued Langgaard (1937, rev. 1949)
 Symphony No. 4, Folksong Symphony, by Roy Harris (1940)
 Symphony No. 4, The Revelation of Saint John, by Hilding Rosenberg (1940) *
 Symphony No. 6, by Erwin Schulhoff (1940)
 Symphony No. 9, Op. 93, Everlasting Times after J. Tuwim and V. Bronievsky, by Mieczyslaw Weinberg (1940-67)
 Symphony No. 4, Op. 29, Sinfonia Sacra, by Vagn Holmboe (1941) *
 Symphony No. 2, KSS72, Jāmī, by Kaikhosru Shapurji Sorabji (1942–51)
 Symphony No. 1, Proti Simfonia, by Mikis Theodorakis (1943-45)
 The Airborne Symphony, by Marc Blitzstein (1943–46)
 Den judiska sången, by Moses Pergament (1944)
 Symphony No. 6, In Memoriam, by Alexandre Tansman (1944)
 Symphony No. 5, The Keeper of the Garden, by Hilding Rosenberg (1945)
 Odysseus (Symphony No. 2), by Armstrong Gibbs (first performed 1946)
 Symphony No. 3, Te Deum, by Darius Milhaud (1946)
 Spring Symphony, by Benjamin Britten (1947) *
 Symphony No. 5, by Dimitrie Cuclin (1947)
 Suite (Symphony no. 14), Morgenen, BVN. 336, by Rued Langgaard (1947-48, rev. 1951)
 Symphony No. 4, The Cycle, by Peter Mennin (1948)
 Symphony No. 10, by Dimitrie Cuclin (1949)
 Symphony No. 12, by Dimitrie Cuclin (1951)
 Symphony No. 8, by Henry Cowell (1952) *
 Symphony No. 10, Amerindia, by Heitor Villa-Lobos (1952-1953)
 Symphony No. 4, da Paz, by Cláudio Santoro (1953)
 Symphony No. 9, Op. 54, Sinfonia Visionaria, by Kurt Atterberg (1956) *
 Deutsche Sinfonie, by Hanns Eisler (1957) *
 Nirvana Symphony, by Toshiro Mayuzumi (1958)
 Symphony No. 12, Op. 188, Choral, by Alan Hovhaness (1960)
 Symphony No. 13 in B-flat minor, Op. 113, Babi Yar, by Dmitri Shostakovich (1962) *
 Symphony No. 6, Op. 79, after Leib Kvitko, Shmuel Halkin and M. Lukonin, by Mieczyslaw Weinberg (1962-63)
 Symphony No. 3, Kaddish, by Leonard Bernstein (1963)
 Symphony No. 8, Op. 83, Flowers of Poland after J. Tuwim, by Mieczyslaw Weinberg (1964) *
 Symphony No. 2, Op. 28, Marina, after Marina Tsvetaeva by Boris Tishchenko (1964) *
 Symphony No. 10, Abraham Lincoln, by Roy Harris (1965)
 Vocal Symphony, by Ivana Loudová (1965)
 Choral Symphony, by Jean Coulthard (1967)
 Sinfonia by Luciano Berio (1969)
 Symphony No. 1, Die Heimat, by Kurt Graunke (1969)
 Symphony No. 11, Op. 101, Festive Symphony after various revolutionary poets, by Mieczyslaw Weinberg (1969)
 Symphony No. 2, Op. 31, Copernicus, by Henryk Górecki (1972) *
 Symphony No. 9, Sinfonia Sacra, Op. 140, The Resurrection, by Edmund Rubbra (1972) *
 Symphony No. 3, The Icy Mirror, by Malcolm Williamson (1972) *
 Symphony No. 2, by Avet Terterian (1972)
 Symphony No. 24, Op. 273, Majnun, by Alan Hovhaness (1973)
 Symphony No. 12 De döda på torget (The Dead of the Square), by Allan Pettersson (1973–1974) *
 Symphony No. 2, Sinfonia mistica, by Kenneth Leighton (1974)
 Symphony No. 13, Bicentennial Symphony, by Roy Harris (1976)
 Symphony No. 3, by Wolfgang Rihm (1976-77)
 Symphony No. 5, by Camargo Guarnieri (1977)
 Symphony No. 7, A Sea Symphony, by Howard Hanson (1977) *
 Sinfonia fidei, Op. 95, by Alun Hoddinott (1977)
 Symphony No. 15, Op. 119, I Believe in This Earth after M. Dudin, by Mieczyslaw Weinberg (1977)
 Symphony No. 2, Saint Florian, by Alfred Schnittke (1979)
 Symphony No. 2, The Song of the Earth, by Mikis Theodorakis (1980-81)
 Symphony No. 3, by Mikis Theodorakis (1981-2) *
 Harmonium, by John Adams (1981) *
 Symphony No. 6, by Avet Terterian (1981) *
 Symphony No. 7, Spring-Symphony, by Mikis Theodorakis (1982) *
 Symphony No. 3, Sinfonia da Requiem, by József Soproni (1983)
 Symphony No. 6, Aphorisms, by Einar Englund (1984)
 Symphony No. 4, by Alfred Schnittke (1984)
 Symphony No. 5, by Anatol Vieru (1984-85) *
 Symphony No. 58, Sinfonia Sacra, Op. 389, by Alan Hovhaness (1985)
 Symphony No. 18, Op. 138, War, there is no word more cruel after S. Orlov and A. Tvardovsky, by Mieczyslaw Weinberg (1986)
 Symphony No. 4, Symphony of Choirs, by Mikis Theodorakis (1986-87) *
 Symphony No. 7, Pietas by Erkki-Sven Tüür (1987)
The Dawn Is at Hand, by Malcolm Williamson (1987–89) *
 Symphony No. 3, Journey without Distance, by Richard Danielpour (1989) *
 Symphony No. 7, Op. 116, The Keys of the Kingdom, by Jan Hanuš (1990)
 Leaves of Grass: A Choral Symphony, by Robert Strassburg (1992)  
 Mythodea, by Vangelis (1993) *
 Lili'uokalani Symphony by Lalo Schifrin (1993)
 Symphony No. 2, by Philip Bračanin (1995/1997)
 Symphony No. 7, Seven Gates of Jerusalem, by Krzysztof Penderecki (1996)
 Symphony No. 6, Choral, by Carl Vine (1996) *
 Symphony No. 9, by Hans Werner Henze (1997) *
 Symphony 1997: Heaven - Earth - Mankind, by Tan Dun (1997)
 Symphony No. 5, Choral, by Philip Glass (1999) *
 Symphony No. 4, The Gardens, by Ellen Taaffe Zwilich (1999)
 River Symphony, by Sean O'Boyle (1999)
 Symphony No. 2, by Lowell Liebermann (1999)
 2000 Today: A World Symphony for the Millenium, by Tan Dun (1999) *
 Symphony No. 9, The Spirit of Time, by Robert Kyr (2000)
 Symphony No. 4, Star Chant, by Ross Edwards (2001)
 Dante Symphony No. 4, Purgatory, from choreo-symphonic cycle Beatrice, by Boris Tishchenko (2003)
 Symphony No. 7, Toltec, by Philip Glass (2005) *
 Symphony No. 8, Songs of Transitoriness, by Krzysztof Penderecki (2005)
 Symphony No. 2, Festinemus amare homines, by Pawel Lukaszewski (2005)
 Symphony No. 3, Planet Earth, by Johan de Meij (2006)
 Symphony No. 1, Symphony of Providence, by Pawel Lukaszewski (2008)
 Symphony No. 3, Poems and Prayers, by Mohammed Fairouz (2010)
 Symphony No. 3, Symphony of Angels, by Pawel Lukaszewski (2010)
 Dreams of the Fallen, by Jake Runestad, a choral symphony-concerto for solo piano, chorus, and orchestra set to texts of the poet Brian Turner (2013)
 Symphony No. 10, Alla ricerca di Borromini, Op. 327, by Peter Maxwell Davies (2013)
  Unfinished Remembering by Paul Spicer (2014), a choral symphony for baritone and soprano soloists, orchestra, semi-chorus, and chorus set to a text by Euan Tait.
 Symphony No. 11, Hillsborough Memorial, by Michael Nyman (2014)

Symphonies for unaccompanied chorus
Works are listed in chronological order. These works are scored without orchestra, but the composers nevertheless titled or sub-titled them as symphonies.

 Atalanta in Calydon, by Granville Bantock (1911)
 Vanity of Vanities, by Granville Bantock (1913)
 A Pageant of Human Life, by Granville Bantock (1913)
 Symphony for Voices, by Roy Harris (1935)
 Symphony for Voices, by Malcolm Williamson (1962)
 Know Yourself - Symphony for Mixed Choir a cappella, by Alexander Shchetynsky (2003)

Notes

Sources